Ibei HaNahal (lit. Buds of the Valley) is an Israeli outpost within the Gush Etzion settlement block in the West Bank. It was founded in 1999 and named after Biblical words from Song of Songs 6:11.

The residents established it as an ecovillage. The outpost is under the jurisdiction of the Gush Etzion Regional Council. The international community considers Israeli settlements in the West Bank illegal under international law, but the Israeli government disputes this.

References

Religious Israeli settlements
Gush Etzion Regional Council